Destiny of Love is the second special album by South Korean pianist Yiruma.

Track listing

References

1. https://web.archive.org/web/20120612050534/http://www.alexdang.com/2010/08/yiruma-destiny-of-love-2005.html

2005 albums
Yiruma albums